Slovenian Montenegrins (Montenegrin: Slovenački Crnogorci) are a national minority in Slovenia. Until 1991, Montenegro and Slovenia were both constituent republics of the Socialist Federative Republic of Yugoslavia, and as such there was freedom of movement among nations.

According to the 2002 Slovenian census there are 2,667 ethnic Montenegrins in Slovenia.

Notable people
Žarko Đurišić, basketball scout, coach, and former player
Bjanka Adžić Ursulov, costume and set designer
Vinko Glanz, architect
Milada Kalezić, actress
Jan Plestenjak, singer
Boris Popovič, politician and Mayor of Koper
Velimir Vulikić, doctor and publicist
Senidah, singer-songwriter

See also 
 Montenegro–Slovenia relations

References
 

 
Slovenians
Ethnic groups in Slovenia